The 1984 Tour de Romandie was the 38th edition of the Tour de Romandie cycle race and was held from 8 May to 13 May 1984. The race started in Meyrin and finished in Saint-Imier. The race was won by Stephen Roche of the La Redoute team.

General classification

References

1984
Tour de Romandie
1984 Super Prestige Pernod International